Esary Lake is a small lake located east of Port Alberni, British Columbia, Canada.  It lies west of Horne Lake.

Access
Access to the lake is up past horne lake caves left over bridge on the left follow up to logging access gate. 4 kilometers up there is a fork stay to the right Esary lake will be seen on the right. 4x4 required to get to the lake or a short hike from the logging road to the water.

References

Alberni Valley
Lakes of Vancouver Island
Lakes of British Columbia
Alberni Land District